Isaiah Schafer (born June 7, 1990) is an American soccer player.

References

 USL Pro profile 
 VPS transfer news
 Finnish league transfer news

1990 births
Living people
American soccer players
Real Colorado Foxes players
Phoenix FC players
USL League Two players
USL Championship players
Vaasan Palloseura players
Pittsburgh Riverhounds SC players
FC Tulsa players
Soccer players from Colorado
American expatriate soccer players
Expatriate footballers in Finland
American expatriate sportspeople in Finland
Association football defenders

https://www.uslchampionship.com/roster_players/13269121?subseason=280291

'''Personal Life:

Isaiah Schafer is a professional soccer player who currently works in the field of athlete development.